Paul Petter Waldenström (alternately spelled "Paul Peter") (20 July 1838 – 14 July 1917) was a Swedish theologian who became the most prominent leader of the free church movement in late 19th century Sweden.

Waldenström was born in Luleå in northern Sweden, son of a district physician. He began his academic studies at Uppsala University in 1857, completed his Ph.D. degree there in 1863, and was ordained a priest in 1864. He had been employed as an adjunct in the Växjö högre allmänna läroverk (the secondary school in Växjö) already in 1862 and in 1864, when his doctorate qualified him for this, received a lecturership in Christianity, Greek and Hebrew at the secondary school in Umeå. From 1874 until 1905 he was lecturer in the same subjects at the secondary school in Gävle. He was awarded a Doctor of Theology degree from Yale University in 1889 and was awarded the laurel for a second time as a jubeldoktor ("jubilee doctor") in Uppsala in 1913.

Work in the free church movement
Although he worked as a school teacher his whole life, Waldenström's notability comes from his work as a theologian, editor of Christian periodicals, and a preacher. He was long a leading member of the Swedish Evangelical Mission (Evangeliska fosterlandsstiftelsen), a movement within the state church, but was among those who left the organization in 1878 to form the Swedish Mission Covenant (Svenska missionsförbundet, since 2003 the Mission Covenant Church of Sweden, the Svenska missionskyrkan), which long had an ambivalent relationship to the state church, torn between the relative moderation of Waldenström and the greater radicalism of the first president Erik Jakob Ekman (1842–1915) and his followers. After Ekman's resignation in 1904, Waldenström became the president of the society. He was influenced by revivalist Carl Olof Rosenius and in 1868 began editing Pietisten ('The Pietist'), a publication founded by Rosenius and Methodist George Scott and associated with the free church movement. This proved to be very influential both in Sweden and abroad; in America, the Evangelical Covenant Church was greatly influenced by his life and writings.

Theological contributions
Waldenström's influence can be partially summed up in the maxim often associated with his movement: "where does it stand written?" (Swedish: Var står det skrivet?). This cry reflects his passion for the Bible. The fact that Waldenström spent 11 years translating the New Testament from Greek to Swedish shows his devotion to the Holy Texts. His influence is not limited to translation and exegesis. He led an active political life, wrote on a variety of theological topics, and was a key figure in the Nyevangelism movement.

He wrote a book titled "Baptism and Infant Baptism" (Swedish: Dop och Barndop). But perhaps his greatest legacy is his understanding of justification and atonement. He rejected that the prevailing notion that God's wrath was satisfied by the cross because it made God the object of reconciliation and lacked scriptural support. He instead asserted that humanity, not God, was the object of the atonement; that God was the initiator, not the recipient, of the work of reconciliation in Christ.

References

Nordisk familjebok. vol 31, col 398ff 
Olsson, Karl A. By one spirit: a history of The Evangelical Covenant Church of America. Chicago: Covenant Press, 1962.
Waldenstrom, P.P. Excerpts from devotional works, translated by Pietisten. 
Waldenstrom, Paul Peter. "Dop och Barndop - English Translation"

Further reading
Anderson, Philip J. ”Paul Peter Waldenström and America: Influence and Presence in Historical Perspective.” The Covenant Quarterly Vol. LII, No. 4 (1994) 2-21.
Clifton-Soderstrom, Michelle A. ”’Happily Ever After?’ Paul Peter Waldenström: Be ye reconciled to God” Ex Auditu Vol. 26 (2010) 91–106.
Dahlén, Rune W. ”Waldenström’s View of the Bible.” The Covenant Quarterly Vol. LII, No. 4 (1994) 37–52.
Frisk, Donald C. ”The Work of Jesus Christ.” Covenant Affirmations: This We Believe. Chicago: Covenant Press, 1981. 89–106.
Olsson, Karl A. “Paul Peter Waldenström and Augustana.” in The Swedish Immigrant Community in Transition; Essays in Honor of Dr. Conrad Bergendoff.  Ed. J. Iverne Dowie and Ernest M. Espelie.  Rock Island, Illinois: Augustana Historical Society 1963.  107–120.
Phelan, John E. Jr. “Reading Like a Pietist.” The Swedish-American Historical Quarterly Vol. LXIII, Nos. 2-3 (2012) 202–224.
Safstrom, Mark. “Defining Lutheranism from the Margins: Paul Peter Waldenström on Being a ‘Good Lutheran’ in America.” The Swedish-American Historical Quarterly Vol. LXIII, Nos. 2-3 (2012) 101-134.
Safstrom, Mark. ”Making Room for the Lost: Congregational Inclusivity in Waldenström’s Squire Adamsson.” The Covenant Quarterly  Vol. LXXI, Nos. 3-4 (2013) 52–72.
Safstrom, Mark. “The Religious Origins of Democratic Pluralism: Paul Peter Waldenström and the Politics of the Swedish Awakening 1868-1917.”  PhD diss., University of Washington, 2010.
Waldenstrom, Paul Peter. Squire Adamsson, Or, Where do you live?: An Allegorical tale from the Swedish Awakening. Seattle: Pietisten 2013 & 2014. 

1838 births
1917 deaths
19th-century Swedish Lutheran priests
Swedish theologians
Swedish evangelicals
19th-century Protestant theologians
People from Luleå
20th-century Swedish Lutheran priests